The National Solidarity Party (PSN) was a political party in Portugal.

History
The party was established in 1990 and sought to represent the interests of pensioners. In the 1991 parliamentary elections it received 1.68% of the vote and won a seat in the Assembly of the Republic, taken by its president, Manuel Sérgio. However, its vote share was reduced to just 0.21% in the 1995 elections, resulting in the party losing its seat.

The 1999 elections saw the party's vote share remain at 0.21%. After failing to regain parliamentary representation, it did not contest any further elections, and was declared defunct in 2006.

The party also contested the elections for the European Parliament in 1994 and 1999, winning no seats in both cases.

Election results

Assembly of the Republic

European Parliament

References

Defunct political parties in Portugal
Political parties established in 1990
Political parties disestablished in 2006
1990 establishments in Portugal
2006 disestablishments in Portugal
Pensioners' parties